Heliomata infulata, the rare spring moth, is a species of geometrid moth in the family Geometridae. It is found in North America.

The MONA or Hodges number for Heliomata infulata is 6263.

References

Further reading

 

Macariini
Articles created by Qbugbot
Moths described in 1863